The Curtiss Model 41 Lark was a commercial biplane manufactured by Curtiss Aeroplane and Motor Company that was used by pioneering airmail, airline and bush pilots in the 1920s.

Development

The biplane was based on the Curtiss Carrier Pigeon, a purpose-built aircraft for airmail operations. The Lark also had a longer-span lower wing, similar to the Carrier Pigeon. Some models were converted to floatplane configuration with a central mounted pontoon and wing-mounted floats.

The biplane was made of welded tube with fabric covering. It was available with three engine choices, the Curtiss C-6, the Wright J-4 Whirlwind, and the Wright-Hisso E. All four wing panels were interchangeable, giving the aircraft its unusual longer lower wings.

A 200 hp Wright J-4 variant was tested for the United States Navy. This installation proved superior in performance to the Curtiss engined model. This version eventually became the basis for the Curtiss Fledgling series of aircraft.

Operational history

Patrica Airways operated a Lark for early bushplane operations. The aircraft flew with floats in warm weather, and skis in the winter. The aircraft was pressed into service as an early hearse once, with the cargo needing to be seated upside down in the open seat and secured with haywire.

Florida Airways operated a Curtiss Lark Miss Tallahassee on its CAM-10 U.S. airmail route between Miami and Atlanta. The aircraft was bought to take the place of two lost Stout 2-AT Pullman aircraft that could not operate out of the poorly prepared airstrips.

Colonial Air Transport owned a Curtiss Lark which was one of the first aircraft to be registered using the new Underwriters Laboratories all-letter system (1921 to 1923). This Lark, registered as N-AABC, was used on the CAM-1 U.S. airmail route.

Specifications (Curtiss C-6 engine)

Notes

References

External links

  Canadian Aviation and Science Museum photos of the Curtiss Lark

Lark
Single-engined tractor aircraft
1920s United States mailplanes
1920s United States civil utility aircraft
Biplanes
Aircraft first flown in 1925